Joy is a series of semi-autobiographical erotic novels by Joy Laurey, the pen name of Jean-Pierre Imbrohoris. The character is a supermodel whose father is American and mother is French.

The books have been adapted as movies and TV miniseries.

Novels
Joy (1981)
Joy and Joan (1982)
Joy in Love  
The Return of Joy

Movies
Joy with Claudia Udy as Joy
Joy and Joan with Brigitte Lahaie as Joy and Isabelle Solar as Joan
Joy in Love (TV miniseries) with Zara Whites as Joy
Joy in Hong Kong (1992)
Joy in Moscow (1992)
Joy in Africa (1992)
Joy in San Francisco (1992)
Joy and the Pharaohs  (1993) with Zara Whites as Joy

External links

Jake Laser at IMDb

French erotic novels
Novel series
Works published under a pseudonym